Darnell Robert Stapleton (born September 21, 1985) is an offensive line assistant coach for the Florida Gators football team. A former American football offensive lineman, Stapleton was the starting right guard on the Super Bowl XLIII champion Pittsburgh Steelers as they beat the Arizona Cardinals. He played college football at Rutgers.

He was also a member of the Florida Tuskers and New England Patriots.

Early years
Stapleton played football for Union High School. As a senior in 2002, he was a first-team All-Watchung Conference selection, and a first-team all-county selection.
His younger brother Desmond played offensive tackle at Rutgers, and signed with the Steelers as an undrafted free agent after the 2012 NFL Draft.

College career

Junior college
Stapleton attended Hudson Valley Community College for two seasons. In 2003, he earned second-team all-league honors. He started 11 games in 2004, and was a first-team All-Northeast Football Conference selection and a preseason NJCAA Honorable Mention All-American.

Rutgers University
Following junior college, Stapleton enrolled at Rutgers University, where he became the team's starting center in spring camps in 2005. He started 12 games on the season. In his senior year, Stapleton started 13 games and was a finalist for the Rimington Trophy, given to the nation's best center. The Rutgers offensive line allowed only eight sacks on the season, the fewest in the nation, while Rutgers running back Ray Rice set a Big East Conference record with 1,794 yards on the season. Stapleton was awarded the David Bender Trophy, given to the team's best offensive lineman.

NFL career

Pittsburgh Steelers
Stapleton was signed as an undrafted free agent by the Pittsburgh Steelers following the 2007 NFL Draft. He made the Steelers' 53-man roster in his rookie season but was inactive for every regular season and playoff game. In 2008, Stapleton was a reserve for the first four games of the season, before starting the final 12 games at right guard in place of an injured Kendall Simmons. He also started the team's three playoff games, including the Super Bowl XLIII victory over the Arizona Cardinals. He did not play in the team's first three preseason games in 2009 before being placed on injured reserve on August 31, 2009, with a knee injury. He was not offered a tender by the team as a restricted free agent following the season.

Florida Tuskers
Stapleton signed to play with the United Football League's Florida Tuskers in July 2010.

New England Patriots
Stapleton signed with the New England Patriots on August 9, 2010. He was waived on August 11.

Coaching career

New York Sharks
As of 2011 Stapleton is the head coach for the New York Sharks, a professional women's football team in the Women's Football Alliance.  The New York Sharks are the longest running and winningest team in women's football history with 3 conference titles (2002, 2003, 2004 IWFL East), 6 division titles (2002, 2003, 2004, 2005, 2006, 2007 IWFL) and 1 championship title (2002 IWFL).

Montclair Kimberley Cougars
Stapleton coached the offensive and defensive lines at Montclair Kimberly Academy for the 2012 season. The Cougars went 9–2, their best ever record.

Rutgers Scarlet Knights
After his brief stint as head coach of the New York Sharks, Darnell Stapleton returned to Rutgers for the position of offensive assistant in 2012.

Pace University Setters
Stapleton was supposed to be an offensive line coach for the 2014 Setters season, however on July 16, 2014, he announced that he would be joining the Bucknell University Bison for their 2014 season.

References

External links
Bucknell bio
Pittsburgh Steelers bio
Official website

1985 births
Living people
People from Union Township, Union County, New Jersey
Players of American football from New Jersey
American football offensive guards
American football centers
Bucknell Bison football coaches
Rutgers Scarlet Knights football players
Pittsburgh Steelers players
Florida Tuskers players
New England Patriots players
Rutgers Scarlet Knights football coaches
Sportspeople from Union County, New Jersey
Hudson Valley Vikings football players
Union High School (New Jersey) alumni